Lord of the Universe is a 1974 documentary film on Guru Maharaj Ji (Prem Rawat).

Lord of the Universe may also refer to:

 God in monotheistic traditions including Judaism, Christianity, and Islam
 Shiva in his role as creator in Bhakti literature
 Gautama Buddha (c. 5th to 4th century BCE), founder of the world religion of Buddhism
 Prem Rawat (born 1957), a religious teacher formerly known as Guru Maharaj Ji

See also
 Lord of Universe Church, a Chinese salvationist sect
 Adon Olam, a Jewish hymn
 Lord (disambiguation)
 Universe (disambiguation)
 God (disambiguation)
 Hermetic Order of the Golden Dawn, a secret society devoted to study of the occult in the late 19th and early 20th centuries